The 1976–77 season was Mansfield Town's 40th season in the Football League and 13th in the Third Division, they finished in 1st position with 64 points gaining their first promotion to the second tier.

Final league table

Results

Football League Third Division

FA Cup

League Cup

Squad statistics
 Squad list sourced from

References
General
 Mansfield Town 1976–77 at soccerbase.com (use drop down list to select relevant season)

Specific

Mansfield Town F.C. seasons
Mansfield Town